Tommy Casey was a professional baseball pitcher in the American Association. He pitched in one game on August 17, 1887, for the Philadelphia Athletics.

External links

Major League Baseball pitchers
19th-century baseball players
Philadelphia Athletics (AA) players
Wilmington Quicksteps (minor league) players